Bruce Cameron Young is an Australian Liberal National politician who was the member of the Legislative Assembly of Queensland for Keppel from 2012 to 2015.

References

Living people
Year of birth missing (living people)
Liberal National Party of Queensland politicians
Members of the Queensland Legislative Assembly
21st-century Australian politicians